KeyNote is a free notetaking and outlining text editor for Microsoft Windows, produced by Tranglos Software.

Overview
Keynote is based on the tree data structure concept, allowing "nodes" in a tree panel (much like the tree panel in Windows file managers) to represent separate fields within a single text file. Individual documents within the tree can be edited in Rich Text Format (RTF) or simple text (unformatted).

Import and export of KeyNote files to and from TreePad files is fully supported. Each field is treated as a separate virtual document within the tree.

KeyNote is open-source software developed in Delphi 3.  As of October 2005, development of the original program had ceased.

Keynote NF
Development was resumed in 2006 by Daniel Prado, with a project called "KeyNote NF" (or "KeyNote - New Features") to distinguish it from other Google search results. Initially released on SourceForge, and presently on Github, it includes features such as alarm reminders on nodes.
Current versions  are 1.7.8.1 stable and 1.7.9.8 Beta but, since that time, the project does not seem to have been under active development.

See also
Comparison of notetaking software
Zim

References

External links
 original KeyNote project on SourceForge (abandoned)
 KeyNote - New Features (KeyNote NF) (project on github.com)
 Daniel Prado's blog
 KeyNote 1.7 file format specification

Note-taking software
Windows text editors